Bala (Medora Lake) Aerodrome  is located  north northwest of Bala, Ontario, Canada.

See also
List of airports in the Bala, Ontario area

References

Registered aerodromes in Ontario

Transport in Bala, Ontario